The 2005 Abierto Mexicano Telcel was both a men's and women's tennis tournament on the 2005 ATP and WTA Tours that was held in Acapulco, Mexico. The tournament was held from February 21 to February 27.

Finals

Men's singles

 Rafael Nadal defeated  Albert Montañés 6–1, 6–0
 It was Nadal's 2nd title of the year and the 3rd of his career.

Women's singles

 Flavia Pennetta defeated  Ľudmila Cervanová, 3–6, 7–5, 6–3

Men's doubles

 David Ferrer /  Santiago Ventura defeated  Jiří Vaněk /  Tomáš Zíb 4–6, 6–1, 6–4

Women's doubles

 Alina Jidkova /  Tatiana Perebiynis defeated  Rosa María Andrés Rodríguez /  Conchita Martínez Granados, 7–5, 6–3

External links
Official website
Men's Singles Draw
Men's Doubles Draw
Men's Qualifying Singles Draw
Women's Draws

 
2005
Abierto Mexicano Telcel
Abierto Mexicano Telcel
February 2005 sports events in Mexico